Mammaste (Võro: Mamastõ) is a settlement in Põlva Parish, Põlva County in southeastern Estonia.

Gallery

References

External links
Satellite map at Maplandia.com

Villages in Põlva County
Kreis Werro